Maschen is a village in the municipality of Seevetal in Harburg district in the German state of Lower Saxony. It lies south of Hamburg on the northern edge of the Lüneburg Heath and within the commuter zone of the city of Hamburg. Maschen Marshalling Yard is the largest of its kind in Europe and the second biggest in the world. It was opened in 1977.

With its 9,266 inhabitants (as at: 31 December 2005) Maschen is the second largest village in Seevetal. Maschen was first mentioned in the records in 1294 as Merschene (Low German = end of the marsh). In 1671 the first school was built; it has moved location several times since. Today Maschen Primary School is in the centre of Maschen next to the village hall. The restored school clock from the old school has been installed in the tower of the hall.

The Maschen disc brooch is an Early Medieval fibula, which was found on the late Saxon grave field near Maschen.

Villages in Lower Saxony